The campus of the University of Leeds contains a number of listed buildings from tombstones in the former Woodhouse Cemetery (now called St George's Field) through Gothic revival buildings such as the Great Hall to the Brutalist Roger Stevens building.

References

Lists of listed buildings in West Yorkshire
Grade II* listed buildings in West Yorkshire
Grade II listed buildings in West Yorkshire
Buildings and structures of the University of Leeds